Senator Bernstein may refer to:

Abraham Bernstein (politician) (1918–1990), New York State Senate
Robert A. Bernstein (born 1961), Massachusetts State Senate